Matchaponix may refer to:

Matchaponix, New Jersey
Matchaponix Brook